The 1979 Giro del Trentino was the third edition of the Tour of the Alps cycle race and was held on 27 February to 1 March 1979. The race started and finished in Riva del Garda. The race was won by Knut Knudsen.

General classification

References

1979
1979 in road cycling
1979 in Italian sport
February 1979 sports events in Europe
March 1979 sports events in Europe